Canning subdivision is an administrative subdivision of the South 24 Parganas district in the Indian state of West Bengal.

Subdivisions
South 24 Parganas district is divided into five administrative subdivisions:

13.97% of the total population of South 24 Parganas district live in Canning subdivision.

Administrative units
Canning subdivision has 6 police stations, 4 community development blocks, 4 panchayat samitis, 46 gram panchayats, 241 mouzas, 228 inhabited villages and 10 census towns. The census towns are: Kalaria, Gaur Daha, Banshra, Rajapur, Taldi, Bayarsingh, Matla, Dighirpar, Makhal Tala and Basanti.

Police stations
Police stations in Canning subdivision have the following features and jurisdiction:

Blocks
Community development blocks in Canning subdivision are:

Gram panchayats
The subdivision contains 46 gram panchayats under 4 community development blocks:

 Basanti CD block consists of 13 gram panchayats: Amjhara, Chunakhali, Kanthalberia, Uttar Mokamberia, Basanti, Foolmalancha, Maszidbati, Bharatgarh, Jharkhali, Nafarganj, Charabidya, Jyotishpur and Ramchandrakhali.
 Canning I CD block consists of ten gram panchayats: Banshra, Gopalpur, Matla I, Taldi, Daria, Hatpukuria, Matla II, Dighirpar, Itkhola and Nikarighata.
 Canning II CD block consists of nine gram panchayats: Atharobanki, Kalikatala, Sarengabad, Deuli I, Matherdighi, Tambuldaha I, Deuli II, Narayanpur and Tambuldaha II.
 Gosaba CD block consists of 14 gram panchayats: Amtali, Chhota Mollakhali, Lahiripur, Rangabelia, Bali I, Gosaba, Pathankhali, Satjelia, Bali II, Kachukhali, Radhanagar Taranagar, Shambhunagar, Bipradaspur and Kumirmari.

Education
South 24 Parganas district had a literacy rate of 77.51% as per the provisional figures of the census of India 2011. Alipore Sadar subdivision had a literacy rate of 81.14%, Baruipur subdivision 77.45%, Canning subdivision 70.98%, Diamond Harbour subdivision 76.26% and Kakdwip subdivision 82.04%
  
Given in the table below (data in numbers) is a comprehensive picture of the education scenario in South 24 Parganas district, with data for the year 2013-14:

.* Does not include data for portions of South 24 Parganas district functioning under Kolkata Municipal Corporation

The following institutions are located in Canning subdivision:
Bankim Sardar College was established at Tangrakhali in 1955.
Sundarban Hazi Desarat College was established at Pathankhali in 1961.
Jibantala Rokeya Mahavidyalaya was established at Mallikati, Jibantala, in 2001.
Sukanta College was established at Bhangonkhali in 2008.

Healthcare
The table below (all data in numbers) presents an overview of the medical facilities available and patients treated in the hospitals, health centres and sub-centres in 2014 in South 24 Parganas district.  
 

Note: The district data does not include data for portions of South 24 Parganas district functioning under Kolkata Municipal Corporation. The number of doctors exclude private bodies.

Medical facilities in Canning subdivision are as follows:

Hospitals: (Name, location, beds)

Canning subdivisional hospital, Canning, 100 beds

Rural Hospitals: (Name, CD block, location, beds)

Matherdighi Rural Hospital, Canning II CD block, Matherdighi, 30 beds
Basanti Rural Hospital, Basanti CD block, Basanti, 30 beds
Gosaba Rural Hospital, Gosaba CD block, Gosaba, 30 beds

Block Primary Health Centres: (Name, CD block, location, beds)

Ghutiari Sharif Block Primary Health Centre, Canning I CD block, Ghutiari Sharif, 10 beds

Primary Health Centres: (CD block-wise)(CD block, PHC location, beds)

Canning II CD block: Kuchitala (Sarangabad) (10)
Basanti CD block: Mahespur (PO Bharadwazpur) (6), Kanthalberia (10), Herobhanga-Jharkhali (PO Jharkhali Bazar) (6)
Gosaba CD block: Chhota Mollakhali (10), Dakshin Radhanagar (PO Dhalarhat) (6)

Legislative Assembly Segments
As per order of the Delimitation Commission in respect of the Delimitation of constituencies in West Bengal, the Gosaba CD Block and two gram panchayats under the Basanti CD Block: Chunakhali and Maszidbati, will together form the Gosaba (Vidhan Sabha constituency). All the other gram panchayats under the Basanti CD Block, along with Atharobanki gram panchayat under the Canning II CD Block will together form the Basanti (Vidhan Sabha constituency). The areas under the Canning I CD Block and the Narayanpur gram panchayat under the Canning II CD Block will together form the Canning Paschim (Vidhan Sabha constituency). All the other seven gram panchayats under the Canning II CD Block will be part of the area covered by the Canning Purba (Vidhan Sabha constituency). The legislative assembly constituencies of Gosaba, Basanti and Canning Paschim will be reserved for Scheduled Castes (SC) candidates. All the four legislative assembly constituencies will be legislative assembly segments of the Jaynagar (Lok Sabha constituency), which will be reserved for Scheduled Castes (SC) candidates.

References

Subdivisions of West Bengal
Subdivisions in South 24 Parganas district
South 24 Parganas district